Trove is an Australian library-database aggregator.

Trove may also refer to:
 Trove, a database-as-a-service component of the OpenStack cloud-computing platform
 Trove (app), a personalized web- and iOS-based news-aggregator application
 Trove (service), an online and mobile marketplace for photos 
 Trove (video game), a 2015 voxel-based adventure game from Trion Worlds
 Treasure trove, a legal concept
 A Treasure's Trove, a 2004 children's book by Michael Stadther